Aspidura ravanai, commonly known as Ravana's rough-sided snake is a species of colubrid snake endemic to Sri Lanka.

Taxonomy
The specific name, ravanai, is in honor of the Sri Lankan mythological King Ravana.

Distribution and habitat
A. ravanai is known only from the western slopes Sri Pada sanctuary in the central highlands of Sri Lanka.

Description
A. ravanai is a small snake similar to its sister lineage A. trachyprocta. The dorsum is dark black in color. A yellowish line runs through the body in venter region.

References

Further reading
Gans C, Fetcho JR. 1982. The Sri Lankan genus Aspidura (Serpentes, Reptilia, Colubridae). Annals of Carnegie Museum 51 (14): 271–316. (Aspidura deraniyagalae, new species).

Aspidura
Reptiles described in 2017
Reptiles of Sri Lanka